Atypha is a monotypic moth genus of the family Noctuidae erected by Jacob Hübner in 1821. Its only species, Atypha pulmonaris, was first described by Eugenius Johann Christoph Esper in 1790. It is found in southern and central Europe, northern Turkey, Transcaucasia and the Caucasus.

References

Xyleninae
Monotypic moth genera